Luke Strobel is a downhill mountain bike rider from Issaquah, Washington, rating several times as the highest-ranked American rider. He began competing internationally in 2006, and is signed with Maxxis Tyres. In August 2009, he won the Mt Snow downhill title on the US ProXCT.

References

Downhill mountain bikers
Living people
People from Issaquah, Washington
American mountain bikers
American male cyclists
Year of birth missing (living people)